Alexander Charles Irwin  (born August 4, 1881) was a Negro leagues pitcher and manager for several years before the founding of the first Negro National League.

Irwin grew up in Evanston, Illinois and played second base for the high school baseball team. During the seasons he played professional baseball, he also coached for Northwestern Academy, a white team.

He was given a job at Howard University in 1904, coaching the track, football, and baseball teams.

References

External links

Negro league baseball managers
Leland Giants players
Minneapolis Keystones players
1881 births
Year of death missing